The Improvisatore is an autobiographical novel by Hans Christian Andersen (1805–1875). First published in 1835, it was an immediate success and is considered to be Andersen's breakthrough. The story, reflecting Andersen's own travels in Italy in 1833, reveals much about his own life and aspirations as experienced by Antonio, the novel's principal character.

Background 
In September 1833, with financial support from Danish well-wishers, Andersen embarked on a cultural trip to Italy. Deeply impressed with everything he experienced and influenced by Madame de Staël's "Corinne ou l'Italie", he began writing his travel tale, The Improvisatore. It was published by Reitzels Forlag in 1835. An immediate success and Andersen's breakthrough, the following year it was published in Germany and, in 1838, in France. For many years, The Improvisatore was the most widely read of all of Andersen's works.

Plot 
In this fictionalized autobiography, the hero Antonio does not arrive as a tourist but grows up in Italy, thus able to show not just the sunny side of life but also some of its shadows. In its structure, the novel reflects Andersen's own life and his travels through Italy. The descriptions of the Italian towns and regions are particularly captivating, expressed in the author's colourful language. Like Andersen himself, Antonio comes from a poor background but fights his way through various crises and amorous relationships until he is finally successful. The last improvisation involves a fishing boat accident in which many lose their lives. But finally Antonio becomes the happy husband of the beautiful young Lara as well as a landowner in Calabria.

Editions

References

External links
 Fra Piazza del Popolo inspiration
 Source

1835 Danish novels
Danish-language novels
Novels by Hans Christian Andersen
Novels set in Italy
Books about Italy